is a Japanese national university located in Higashihiroshima and Hiroshima, Japan. Established in 1929, it was chartered as a university in 1949 following the merge of a number of national educational institutions.

History

Under the National School Establishment Law, Hiroshima University was established on May 31, 1949. After World War II, the school system in Japan was entirely reformed and each of the institutions of higher education under the pre-war system was reorganized. As a general rule, one national university was established in each prefecture, and Hiroshima University became a national university under the new system by combining the pre-war higher educational institutions in Hiroshima Prefecture.

The following eight schools were integrated or merged into Hiroshima University under the new system of education.
 
  - also translated "Hiroshima School of Secondary Education" 
  - also translated "Hiroshima Women's School of Secondary Education"
 
  - also translated "Hiroshima School of Education"
  - also translated "Hiroshima Young Men's Normal School" or "Hiroshima School of Education for Youth" 
 
  

In 1953-1956,  consolidated into Hiroshima University. 

Some of these institutions were already notable. Above all, Hiroshima School of Secondary Education, founded in 1902, had a distinguished place as one of the nation's two centers for training middle school teachers. The Hiroshima University of Literature and Science was founded in 1929 as one of the national universities and, with the Hiroshima School of Secondary Education which was formerly affiliated to it, were highly notable.

The present Hiroshima University, which was created from these two institutions as well as three other "old-system" training institutions for teachers, continues to hold an important position among the universities and colleges in Japan. Hiroshima Higher Technical School, which has many alumnae in the manufacturing industry, was founded in 1920 and was promoted to a Technical College (Senmon Gakko) in 1944. Hiroshima Higher School was founded in 1923 as one of the pre-war higher schools which prepared students for Imperial and other government-supported universities. Although these institutions suffered a great deal of damage due to the atomic bomb that was dropped on Hiroshima on August 6, 1945, they were reconstructed and combined to become the new Hiroshima University. Graduate schools were established in 1953. After completing the reconstruction, in order to seek wider campus, the relocation to local area(Higashihiroshima) was planned and decided by 1972. Hiroshima University relocated to Higashihiroshima from Hiroshima City between 1982 and 1995. In Hiroshima City, there are still some Campuses (School of Medicine, School of Dentistry, School of Pharmaceutical Sciences and Graduate School in these fields in Kasumi Campus and Law School and Center for Research on Regional Economic System in Higashi-Senda Campus).

Schools and graduate schools

Schools
School of Law
School of Economics
School of Letters
School of Education
School of Integrated Arts and Sciences
School of Engineering
School of Science
School of Medicine
School of Dentistry
School of Pharmaceutical Sciences
School of Applied Biological Science

Graduate schools
Graduate School of Advanced Sciences of Matter
Graduate School of Biomedical & Health Sciences
Graduate School of Biosphere Science
Graduate School of Education
Graduate School of Engineering
Graduate School of Integrated Arts and Sciences
Graduate School of International Development and Cooperation
Graduate School of Letters
Graduate School of Science
Graduate School of Social Sciences
Law School

Research institutes
Miyajima Natural Botanical Garden
Research Institute for Radiation Biology and Medicine
Institute for Peace Science
Research Institute for Higher Education

Campus
Higashi-Hiroshima Campus, Kagami-yama 1-chome, Higashihiroshima
Kasumi Campus, 1-2-3, Kasumi, Minami-ku, Hiroshima
Higashisenda Campus, 1-1-89, Higashi-senda-machi, Naka-ku, Hiroshima

Notable alumni
Politics
 Wataru Kubo  - member of the National Diet, Deputy Prime Minister, Minister of Finance
 Osamu Fujimura - member of the National Diet, Chief Cabinet Secretary, Minister of State
 Yoshinobu Ohira - member of the National Diet
 Chōbyō Yara - Chief Executive of the Government of the Ryukyu Islands, Governor of Okinawa Prefecture
 Yura Halim - Chief Minister (Menteri Besar) of Brunei, Brunei Ambassador to Japan

Business
 Takeshi Taketsuru - President of Nikka Whisky Distilling

Academic
 Kuniyoshi Obara - scholar of education, education reformer, founder of Tamagawa Gakuen and Tamagawa University
 Shintaro Uda - engineer, Professor Emeritus at Tohoku University, IEEE Milestone, Japan Academy Prize
 Yoshio Koide - theoretical physicist, Professor Emeritus at University of Shizuoka
 Tsutomu Yanagida - physicist, Professor Emeritus at University of Tokyo, Humboldt Prize, Nishina Memorial Prize
 Tomoyuki Nishita - engineer, Professor Emeritus at University of Tokyo, Steven A. Coons Award
 Akinori Noma - physiologists, Professor Emeritus at Kyoto University
 Katsuya Kodama - peace researcher and sociologist, Vice-President of International Social Science Council at UNESCO
 Tsuguo Hongo - mycologist, Professor Emeritus at Shiga University
 Akira Miyawaki - botanist, Professor Emeritus at Yokohama National University, Blue Planet Prize
 Makoto Nishimura - biologist
 Shigeru Nakayama - historian of science, Professor Emeritus at Kanagawa University
 Kazuyoshi Kino - Buddhist scholar

Culture
 Hiroko Oyamada -  author of fiction, Akutagawa Prize
 Fumiyo Kōno - manga artist
 Kōhei Kiyasu - voice actor, actor, scriptwriter
 Akira Sakata - free jazz saxophonist
 Kenzō Tange - architect, Pritzker Architecture Prize, AIA Gold Medal, Praemium Imperiale, Legion of Honour, Order of Culture
 Hiroyuki Agawa - author of fiction and literary critic, Kikuchi Kan Prize, Noma Literary Prize, Mainichi Publishing Culture Award, Yomiuri Prize for Literature, Japan Art Academy Prize & Imperial Prize of the Japan Art Academy, Person of Cultural Merit, Order of Culture
 Toshiyuki Kajiyama - author of fiction and journalist

Others
Sunao Tsuboi - anti-nuclear and anti-war activist

See also
List of universities in Japan

Notes

References

External links

Hiroshima University
Hiroshima University Study Abroad Program: Information for incoming exchange students from partner universities

 
Educational institutions established in 1949
Universities and colleges in Hiroshima Prefecture
Japanese national universities
1949 establishments in Japan